Frederick North may refer to:
Frederick North, Lord North (1732–1792), Prime Minister of Great Britain
Frederick North, 5th Earl of Guilford (1766–1827), son of the above, politician
Frederick North (MP) (1800–1869), MP for Hastings, kinsman of the above
F. J. North (Frederick John North, 1889–1968), British geologist and museum curator
Frederic North (1866–1921), Western Australian cricketer and civil servant
Freddie North (born 1939), American singer